The 1998 MBNA Platinum 400 was the 12th stock car race of the 1998 NASCAR Winston Cup Series season and the 30th iteration of the event. The race was held on Sunday, May 31, 1998, in Dover, Delaware at Dover International Speedway, a 1-mile (1.6 km) permanent oval-shaped racetrack. The race took the scheduled 400 laps to complete. Within the final laps of the race, Robert Yates Racing driver Dale Jarrett would manage to save enough fuel and overtake the dominant driver of the race, Hendrick Motorsports driver Jeff Gordon to take his 17th career NASCAR Winston Cup Series victory and his second victory of the season. To fill out the podium, Roush Racing driver Jeff Burton and Jeff Gordon would finish second and third, respectively.

Background 

Dover International Speedway is an oval race track in Dover, Delaware, United States that has held at least two NASCAR races since it opened in 1969. In addition to NASCAR, the track also hosted USAC and the NTT IndyCar Series. The track features one layout, a 1-mile (1.6 km) concrete oval, with 24° banking in the turns and 9° banking on the straights. The speedway is owned and operated by Dover Motorsports.

The track, nicknamed "The Monster Mile", was built in 1969 by Melvin Joseph of Melvin L. Joseph Construction Company, Inc., with an asphalt surface, but was replaced with concrete in 1995. Six years later in 2001, the track's capacity moved to 135,000 seats, making the track have the largest capacity of sports venue in the mid-Atlantic. In 2002, the name changed to Dover International Speedway from Dover Downs International Speedway after Dover Downs Gaming and Entertainment split, making Dover Motorsports. From 2007 to 2009, the speedway worked on an improvement project called "The Monster Makeover", which expanded facilities at the track and beautified the track. After the 2014 season, the track's capacity was reduced to 95,500 seats.

Entry list 

 (R) denotes rookie driver.

Practice

First practice 
The first practice session was held on the early afternoon of Friday, May 29.

Second practice 
The second practice session was held on the late afternoon of Friday, May 29.

Final practice 
The final practice session, sometimes referred to as Happy Hour, was held on the afternoon of Saturday, May 30.

Qualifying 
Qualifying was split into two rounds. The first round was held on Friday, May 29, at 3:30 PM EST. Each driver would have one lap to set a time. During the first round, the top 25 drivers in the round would be guaranteed a starting spot in the race. If a driver was not able to guarantee a spot in the first round, they had the option to scrub their time from the first round and try and run a faster lap time in a second round qualifying run, held on Saturday, May 30, at 11:30 AM EST. As with the first round, each driver would have one lap to set a time. On January 24, 1998, NASCAR would announce that the amount of provisionals given would be increased from last season. Positions 26-36 would be decided on time, while positions 37-43 would be based on provisionals. Six spots are awarded by the use of provisionals based on owner's points. The seventh is awarded to a past champion who has not otherwise qualified for the race. If no past champion needs the provisional, the next team in the owner points will be awarded a provisional.

Three drivers would fail to qualify: Dennis Setzer, Morgan Shepherd, and Todd Bodine.

Full qualifying results 

*Time not available.

Race results

References 

1998 NASCAR Winston Cup Series
NASCAR races at Dover Motor Speedway
May 1998 sports events in the United States
1998 in sports in Delaware